Mastino II della Scala (1308 – 3 June 1351) was lord of Verona. He was a member of the famous Scaliger family of Northern Italy.

He was the son of Alboino I della Scala and Beatrice da Correggio. At the death of Cangrande I, he and his brother Alberto II were associated in the rule of Verona. Soon, however, Mastino's independent attitude  overshadowed his brother's presence. In the first part of his reign, abandoning the careful policy of balance held by his father, he conquered Brescia (1332), Parma (1335) in Lombardy and Lucca (1335) in Tuscany.

However, the extension of Mastino's power spurred the creation of League of all the other local powers (Florence, Siena, Bologna, Perugia and Venice). In the first year of war he managed to resist, but in 1336 the League was joined by Azzone Visconti of Milan, the Este of Ferrara, the Gonzaga of Mantua and the Papal States. Surrounded by every side, he could only ask for a treaty of peace through the intermediation of Emperor Louis IV of Bavaria, which he obtained in 1339. His territories were restricted to Verona and Vicenza, the remaining part split among the victorious enemies.

An attempt to recover part of his lands with the German mercenaries that had remained in Vicenza after the war, led by Lodrisio Visconti, was unsuccessful.

He died in Verona in 1351. He is buried in the Gothic mausoleum near the church of Santa Maria Antica, in one of the Scaliger Tombs.

Family
In 1328 he married Taddea da Carrara (daughter of Jacopo I of Padua) and Anna Gradenigo (daughter of Pietro Gradenigo). She gave him the following three legitimate sons and two daughters:
 Verde (d. 1394)
Cangrande (1332–1359) 
Alboino (1333–1375)
Cansignorio (c. 1334–1375) 
 Beatrice Regina della Scala (1331 – 18 June 1384), who married Bernabò Visconti on 27 September 1350
His illegitimate children include:
Fregnano (died 1394) 
Viridis (died 1394), who married Niccolò II d'Este in 1362
Caterina, who married  Aldrighetto di Castelbaro 
Altaluna, who married Louis of Bavaria
Veronese, who married Giacomo Trissino

References

Scala, Mastino 2
Scala, Mastino 2
Mastino 2
Burials at Santa Maria Antica, Verona
14th-century Italian nobility
Lords of Verona
Lords of Padua